The Ashland Yard is an elevated CTA rail yard in the Englewood neighborhood on the South Side of Chicago, Illinois which stores cars from the Green Line of the Chicago Transit Authority. Currently, 5000-series railcars are stored here. It is adjacent to Ashland/63rd station.

References 

  

Chicago Transit Authority